Walt Stack (September 28, 1908 – January 19, 1995) was a hod carrier by trade and an icon of the San Francisco, California running community. Even in his 70s and 80s, Stack ran many more marathons and  ultramarathons than all but a few of his running peers. Stack was featured in Nike's first "Just Do It" advertisement that debuted on July 1, 1988, when he was still running at 80 years of age.

Dolphin South End Running Club 

In the 1960s, Stack was a member of San Francisco's Dolphin Club. Circa 1965/1966, Stack invited members of the South End Rowing Club to meet with him and another Dolphin Club member regarding the formation of a running club that would include women and children for the first time. This club would become known as the Dolphin South End Running Club (DSE), San Francisco's oldest running club and among the oldest in the United States.

In his role as club sage, Stack exhorted his flock to "Start slow... and taper off."  The message conveyed both his wisdom and a sense of enthusiasm for middle and back of the pack fun runners, and the slogan has been emblazoned on all the club's jerseys ever since.

At the DSE races, which have taken place nearly every weekend in and around San Francisco since the 1970s, Walt was usually the master of ceremonies and presenter of ribbons to the top finishers. Stack organized the first Double Dipsea race in 1970, and it is today officially named the "Walt Stack Double Dipsea".

I'm going to do this 'til I get planted

For 27 years, from 1966 until 1993, Stack persisted in covering a set training route.  His highly visible training routine made him a San Francisco institution.  "I'm going to do this 'til I get planted," Stack decreed.  Starting on his bike, he would ride six hilly miles from his Potrero Hill home to Fisherman's Wharf.  Once there, he'd strip off his shirt, displaying tattoos of peacocks, wild horses, and bathing beauties across his chest, and then proceed to run a  route over the Golden Gate Bridge to Sausalito and back, after which he would take a one-mile (1.6 km) swim in the currents of the San Francisco Bay near Alcatraz Island. 

He trained on the course and competed in the venerable (first run in 1905) and arduous Dipsea race. When the Dipsea was over, Stack would turn around and run the course in reverse, known as the Double Dipsea. It is probably noteworthy that Stack could claim that he was the only actual 'prisoner' of Alcatraz Island to have made a successful swim from Alcatraz to the shores of Fisherman's Wharf — Stack was a prisoner on Alcatraz for a six-month period sentenced to hard labor while a youth for having gone Absent Without Leave (AWOL) in the Philippines.  He had in fact swum the distance many times in his later years, as a participant in sanctioned Alcatraz swims which have become quite popular. He often swam year round in those cold Bay waters.

Sports Illustrated once sent a writer to do a story on Stack. The reporter followed him around for a week, getting to know his habits and training routine.  The writer, so impressed at how Walt almost invariably ran eight and a half minute miles - regardless of the distance - came to the conclusion that "Walt Stack's pace is so steady, if he fell out of an airplane he probably would fall at the speed of 8.5 minutes per mile."

Stack is the cause célèbre of many fascinating anecdotes during the course of his life and running career. He was long a card-carrying, dues paying member of the Communist Party. In 1982 he participated in the Ironman Triathlon in Hawaii, and he holds the event record for most time taken to finish, in dead last place. Stack finished in the record-breaking time of just over 26 hours. Officials implemented a cut-off time in subsequent years.

In the summer of 1977, Richard Thalheimer (of The Sharper Image fame), chose Stack to be the poster boy for the Realtime Watch, which Thalheimer promoted as the first affordable, waterproof, and shock-resistant chronograph that could be reliably used by joggers.  Thalheimer took out an ad in Runner's World featuring his friend Walt Stack, and sold thousands of the watches at $69 apiece, earning $1.5 million using Stack's image.

Stack also was an unofficial finisher of the hundred mile long Western States Endurance Run, completing the run in 38 hours and 47 minutes, but not making the cut-off time.

References

External links

 
 DSERunners.com - 'The DSE is a club that encourages runners/walkers of all levels to compete, socialize, have fun, and improve ourselves'
 RunpunxsyRun.org - 'Remembering Walt:  "Start Slow and Taper off."  Walt Stack's advice on running a marathon'
 South-End.org - 'Dipsea, DSE and More', South End Rowing Club

1908 births
1995 deaths
American male ultramarathon runners
Track and field athletes from San Francisco